Nenad Nedeljković (born 10 October 1986) is a Serbian football forward who last played for Dinamo Vranje.

External links
 
 

1986 births
Living people
Sportspeople from Šabac
Association football forwards
Serbian footballers
Serbian expatriate footballers
Serbian expatriate sportspeople in Sweden
Serbian expatriate sportspeople in France
Expatriate footballers in Sweden
Expatriate footballers in France
Blois Football 41 players
RFK Grafičar Beograd players
FK Borac Čačak players
FK Mladost Lučani players
FK Mladi Radnik players
RFK Novi Sad 1921 players
FK Proleter Novi Sad players
FK Železničar Lajkovac players
FK Drina Zvornik players
FK Dinamo Vranje players
Serbian SuperLiga players